The Irish Hills are a low mountain range of the southern outer California Coast Ranges in western San Luis Obispo County, California, and the state's Central Coast region.

It rises between San Luis Obispo and the Pacific Ocean, south of Los Osos Valley Road to Morro Bay.

Ecology

The hills support seasonally verdant non-native grasslands, with native chaparral and oak woodland habitats,

Los Osos Oaks State Natural Reserve lies on the northwestern slope, near the community of Los Osos.

References

Mountain ranges of San Luis Obispo County, California
California Coast Ranges
Hills of California
Mountain ranges of Southern California